Beesley's Point is an unincorporated community in Upper Township, in Cape May County, New Jersey, United States. Beesley's Point is on Peck Bay across from Ocean City. Beesley's Point is home to the Beesley's Point Generating Station and one end of the now-closed Beesley's Point Bridge.

A post office was established in 1851, with Joseph Chatten as the first postmaster.

Demographics

Education
As with other parts of Upper Township, the area is zoned to Upper Township School District (for grades K-8) and Ocean City School District (for high school). The latter operates Ocean City High School.

Countywide schools include Cape May County Technical High School and Cape May County Special Services School District.

Previously it had its own school.

References

Upper Township, New Jersey
Unincorporated communities in Cape May County, New Jersey
Unincorporated communities in New Jersey